Georgi Tsurtsumia (born October 29, 1980 in Tsalenjikha, Georgian SSR) is a Kazakh wrestler who competed in the Men's Greco-Roman 120 kg at the 2004 Summer Olympics and won the silver medal.

References

External links
 

1980 births
Living people
People from Samegrelo-Zemo Svaneti
Wrestlers at the 2004 Summer Olympics
Olympic silver medalists for Kazakhstan
Olympic wrestlers of Kazakhstan
Olympic medalists in wrestling
Asian Games medalists in wrestling
Wrestlers at the 2002 Asian Games
Medalists at the 2004 Summer Olympics
Kazakhstani male sport wrestlers
Asian Games gold medalists for Kazakhstan
Medalists at the 2002 Asian Games
Kazakhstani people of Georgian descent
21st-century Kazakhstani people